Graham Duncan McMillan "Mike" Gilbert (1 March 1911 – 13 February 2002) was a New Zealand rugby union and rugby league footballer. A rugby union fullback, Gilbert represented Buller and West Coast at a provincial level, and was a member of the New Zealand national side, the All Blacks, from 1935 to 1936. He played 27 matches for the All Blacks including four internationals.

He made his début for Buller as a 19-year-old in 1930.

He returned to New Zealand following the outbreak of World War II in 1939 having become captain of the Bradford side. He was reinstated to rugby union in 1995.

References

1911 births
2002 deaths
Bradford Bulls players
Buller rugby union players
New Zealand international rugby union players
New Zealand rugby league players
New Zealand rugby union players
People educated at Buller High School
Rugby league fullbacks
Rugby league players from Rothesay, Bute
Rugby union players from Rothesay, Bute
British emigrants to New Zealand
West Coast rugby union players